This article lists people who have belonged to a guerrilla organization.
Jaime Bateman Cayón (1940–1983), M-19 member
Alfonso Cano (1948–2011), FARC-EP member
Carlos Castaño Gil (1965–2004), ACCU member
Fidel Castaño Gil (1951–1994), ACCU member
Vicente Castaño Gil (born 1957), ACCU member
Álvaro Fayad Delgado (1946–1986), M-19 member
Antonio García (born 1956), ELN member
Vera Grabe Loewenherz (born 1951), former M-19 member
Timoleón Jiménez (born 1959), FARC-EP member
Salvatore Mancuso (born 1969), former AUC member
Iván Marino Ospina (1940–1985), M-19 member
Iván Márquez (born 1955), FARC-EP member
Manuel Marulanda (1930–2008), FARC-EP member
Miguel Ángel Mejía Múnera (born 1959) AUC member
Mono Jojoy (1953–2010), FARC-EP member
Víctor Manuel Mejía Múnera (1959–2008) AUC member
Elda Neyis Mosquera (born 1963), former FARC-EP member
Diego Murillo Bejarano (born 1961) AUC member
Antonio Navarro Wolff (born 1948), former M-19 member
Carlos Pizarro Leongómez (1951–1990), M-19 member
Raúl Reyes (1948–2008), FARC-EP member
Carlos Toledo Plata (1932–1984), M-19 member
Camilo Torres Restrepo (1929–1966), ELN member
Rodrigo Tovar Pupo (born 1950), former AUC member
Fabio Vásquez Castaño (1940–2019), ELN member